İsmail Bayram (born 1 June 1954) is a Turkish weightlifter. He competed in the men's middleweight event at the 1972 Summer Olympics.

References

1954 births
Living people
Turkish male weightlifters
Olympic weightlifters of Turkey
Weightlifters at the 1972 Summer Olympics
Place of birth missing (living people)
20th-century Turkish people